Coal Mines Provident Fund Organisation (CMPF) is an agency of the Indian government established in 1948 under The Coal Mines Provident Fund and Miscellaneous Provisions Act 1948. It serves as the official pension fund of coal miners and is financed by coal producers on a per-tonne basis. The fund pays the pensions of about 500,000 former coal miners, and has been considered financially precarious since 2017.

References

1948 establishments in India
Government agencies established in 1948
Government agencies for energy (India)
Ministry of Consumer Affairs, Food and Public Distribution
Coal organizations